Chaudhary Nand Lal (died 14 April 2019) was an Indian politician from the state of Punjab. Lal represented the Balachaur Assembly Constituency of Punjab and was a four-term (1997-2012) member of the Punjab Legislative Assembly. Lal was a member of the Shiromani Akali Dal party.

Political career

Nand Lal first contested the elections from Balachaur constituency for the Punjab Legislative Assembly in 1992 but was defeated by Hargopal Singh of the BSP. He finished second and received more votes than the incumbent  of the INC.

In 1997, Chaudhary Nand Lal was allotted the ticket to contest from Balachaur on the Shiromani Akali Dal ticket. He won the elections. He retained the seat in 2002, 2007 and 2012.

Nand Lal lost his seat in 2017 elections to INC candidate Darshan Lal Mangupur but finished second and ahead of Brigadier Raj Kumar, the AAP candidate.

He died of cancer on 14 April 2019 at the age of 74.

Life

Chaudhary Nand Lal was born to Mr. Lachman Das in an influential Gujjar family.

References

External links
  Chief Parliamentary Secretaries
 Member of Legislative Assembly

People from Punjab, India
Shiromani Akali Dal politicians
2019 deaths
Year of birth missing
Deaths from cancer in India